Serdar Yiğit Eroğlu is a Turkish kickboxer.

As of January 2022, he was the No. 10 ranked middleweight kickboxer in the world by Beyond Kick.

Career
Eroğlu was scheduled to face Santino Verbeek on September 29, 2018. He won the fight by decision.

On November 3, 2018, Eroğlu faced Ehsan Vafae. He defeated him by technical knockout in the second round.

Eroglu faced Sergey Ponomarev at Ural FC 1 on July 1, 2022. He lost the fight by unanimous decision.

On October 8, 2022, Eroğlu faced Ruben Lee at the BKK World Kickboxing Championships in Dubai for the inaugural 90 kg title. He won the fight by unanimous decision.

Titles and accomplishments

Professional
Bare Knuckle Kombat Kickboxing Championship
 2022 BKK World Kickboxing −90 kg Champion

Awards
 2022 Glove Awards Turkish Male Athlete of the Year

Amateur
World Association of Kickboxing Organizations
 2013 WAKO European Championship Junior Full Contact −86 kg 
 2014 WAKO European Championship Full Contact −86 kg 
 2016 WAKO European Championship Full Contact −86 kg 
 2017 WAKO World Championship Full Contact −91 kg 
International Federation of Muaythai Associations
 2017 IFMA World Championships −91 kg 
 2017 IFMA European Championships −91 kg 
 2018 IFMA World Championships −86 kg 
 2018 IFMA-FISU World Championships −91 kg 
 2022 IFMA World Championships −86 kg

Fight record

|-  bgcolor=""
| 2022-03-26 || ||align=left| || BKK World Kickboxing Championship 2 || Bangkok, Thailand || ||  ||

|-  bgcolor="#cfc"
| 2022-12-23 || Win ||align=left| Gadzhimurad Amirzhanov || FKR PRO 2 || Moscow, Russia || Ext.R Decision || 4 || 3:00

|-  bgcolor="#cfc"
| 2022-10-08 || Win ||align=left| Ruben Lee || BKK World Kickboxing Championship || Dubai, UAE || Decision (Unanimous)|| 3 || 3:00 
|-
! style=background:white colspan=9 |

|-  style="background:#fbb"
| 2022-07-01 || Loss ||align=left| Sergey Ponomarev || Ural FC 1 || Perm, Russia || Decision (Unanimous) || 3 || 3:00

|-  style="background:#cfc;"
| 2022-05-22|| Win||align=left| Denis Cvasnitchi || FFC 6 || Alanya, Turkey || Decision (Unanimous) || 3 || 3:00

|-  style="background:#cfc;"
| 2022-03-05|| Win||align=left| Yanis Rauch || FFC Superfights 2 || Izmir, Turkey || TKO (Referee stoppage) || 1 || 2:41

|-  style="background:#cfc;"
| 2021-12-19|| Win||align=left| Alexandr Golovachev || FFC  || Alanya, Turkey || KO (Knee to the head) || 1 || 2:40

|-  style="background:#cfc;"
| 2021-10-08|| Win||align=left| Leandro Dikmoet || FFC  || Alanya, Turkey || TKO (Punches) || 3 ||

|-  style="background:#cfc;"
| 2021-06-30|| Win||align=left| Cengaver Taylan Kemik || Star Fight Arena|| Adana, Turkey || Decision (Unanimous) || 3 || 3:00

|-  style="background:#cfc;"
| 2019-11-16|| Win||align=left| Ali Takloo || ÖNCÜ FIGHT CLUB || Istanbul, Turkey || Decision || 3 || 3:00

|-  style="background:#cfc;"
| 2019-09-01|| Win||align=left| Omid Nosrati || YOKUŞ FIGHT ARENA || Çorlu, Turkey || Decision (Unanimous) || 3 || 3:00

|-  style="background:#cfc;"
| 2019-04-27|| Win||align=left| Andelko Zlatic || ÖNCÜ FIGHT CLUB || Malatya, Turkey || Decision (Unanimous) || 3 || 3:00

|-  style="background:#cfc;"
| 2019-02-16|| Win||align=left| Arman Bazyari || Akin Dovus Arenasi || Turkey || Decision (Unanimous) || 3 || 3:00

|-  style="background:#cfc;"
| 2019-02-08|| Win||align=left| Florian Kroger || Star Fight Arena || Adana, Turkey || Decision (Unanimous) || 3 || 3:00

|-  style="background:#cfc;"
| 2018-11-03|| Win||align=left| Ehsan Vafae || Star Fight Arena || Adana, Turkey || TKO (Leg injury)|| 2 || 1:31

|-  style="background:#cfc;"
| 2018-09-29|| Win||align=left| Santino Verbeek || ÖNCÜ FIGHT CLUB || Malatya, Turkey || Decision || 3 || 3:00

|-  style="background:#cfc;"
| 2017-11-24|| Win||align=left| Muhamad Mahmić || ÖNCÜ FIGHT CLUB || Turkey || KO (Low kick)|| 1 ||

|-  style="background:#fbb;"
| 2016-04-30|| Loss||align=left| Thomas Bridgewater || ÖNCÜ FIGHT CLUB || Istanbul, Turkey || Decision|| 3||3:00

|-  style="background:#cfc;"
| 2016-02-27|| Win||align=left|  ||  || Istanbul, Turkey || Decision|| 3||3:00

|-
| colspan=9 | Legend:    

|-  style="background:#fbb;"
| 2022-06-02|| Loss ||align=left| Aaron Ortiz || 2022 IFMA World Championships, Semi-finals || Abu Dhabi, UAE || Decision (29:28)  || 3 ||3:00 
|-
! style=background:white colspan=9 |

|-  style="background:#cfc;"
| 2022-05-31|| Win ||align=left| Kyriakos Bakirtzis || 2022 IFMA World Championships, Quarter Finals || Abu Dhabi, UAE || Decision (30:27)  || 3 ||3:00

|-  style="background:#cfc;"
| 2022-05-28|| Win ||align=left| Reda Oudgou || 2022 IFMA World Championships, First Round || Abu Dhabi, UAE || Decision (30:27)  || 3 ||3:00

|-  style="background:#cfc;"
| 2022-03-31 || Win ||align=left| Hasan Mert Müjdeci || 2022 Turkish Muay Thai Championships, Final || Kemer, Turkey || Decision   || 3 ||3:00 
|-
! style=background:white colspan=9 |

|-  style="background:#cfc;"
| 2022-03-30 || Win ||align=left| Ömer Faruk Kaya || 2022 Turkish Muay Thai Championships, Semi-final || Kemer, Turkey || Decision   || 3 ||3:00 
|-

|-  style="background:#cfc;"
| 2022-03-29 || Win ||align=left| Hüseyin Keloğlu || 2022 Turkish Muay Thai Championships, Quarter Final || Kemer, Turkey || Decision   || 3 ||3:00 
|-

|-  style="background:#fbb;"
| 2021-12-08|| Loss||align=left| Anatolii Sukhanov || 2021 IFMA World Championships, First Round || Bangkok, Thailand || Decision (30:27)  || 3 ||3:00

|-  style="background:#fbb"
| 2021-10- || Loss ||align=left| Sergey Ponomarev||  2021 WAKO World Championship, Quarter Final || Jesolo, Italy || Decision (Unanimous) || 3 || 3:00

|-  style="background:#cfc"
| 2021-10- ||Win||align=left| Akhmet Alimbekov || 2021 WAKO World Championship, 1/8 Final || Jesolo, Italy || Decision (Unanimous) || 3 || 3:00

|-  style="background:#cfc;"
| 2020-02-08 || Win ||align=left| Gazi Akman || 2020 Turkish U-23 Muay Thai Championships, Final || Kozaklı, Turkey || Decision   || 3 ||3:00 
|-
! style=background:white colspan=9 |

|-  style="background:#cfc;"
| 2020-02-07 || Win ||align=left| Gokhan Cam || 2020 Turkish U-23 Championships, Semi-final || Kozaklı, Turkey || Decision   || 3 ||3:00 
|-

|-  style="background:#fbb;"
| 2019-10-24|| Loss||align=left| Igor Emkic || 2019 WAKO World Championships, Quarter Finals || Sarajevo, Bosnia and Herzegovina || Decision (Split) || 3 ||2:00

|-  style="background:#cfc;"
| 2019-10-23|| Win||align=left| Alexander Grunwald || 2019 WAKO World Championships, First Round || Sarajevo, Bosnia and Herzegovina || Decision (Split) || 3 ||2:00

|-  style="background:#cfc;"
| 2019-04-07 || Win||align=left| Akhmet Alimbekov || WAKO International Turkish Open, Final || Antalya, Turkey || Decision (30:27) || 3 ||2:00

|-  style="background:#cfc;"
| 2019-04-06 || Win||align=left| İbrahi̇m Haci Özkul || WAKO International Turkish Open, Semi-final || Antalya, Turkey || Decision (30:27) || 3 ||2:00

|-  style="background:#cfc;"
| 2019-04-05 || Win||align=left| Yahia Al-Sharaia || WAKO International Turkish Open, Quarter Final || Antalya, Turkey || Decision (30:27) || 3 ||2:00

|-  style="background:#fbb;"
| 2018-07-28|| Loss||align=left| Matej Penaz || 2018 FISU Muaythai World University Championships, Final || Pattaya, Thailand || Decision (29:28) || 3 ||3:00 
|-
! style=background:white colspan=9 |

|-  style="background:#cfc;"
| 2018-07-26|| Win||align=left| Akhmed || 2018 FISU Muaythai World University Championships, Quarter Finals || Pattaya, Thailand || TKO  || 2 ||

|-  style="background:#fbb;"
| 2018-05-16|| Loss||align=left| Lukasz Radosz || 2018 IFMA World Championship, Semi-finals || Cancun, Mexico || Decision (30:27)  || 3 ||3:00 
|-
! style=background:white colspan=9 |
|-  style="background:#cfc;"
| 2018-05-14|| Win||align=left| Matteo Celli || 2018 IFMA World Championship, Quarter Finals || Cancun, Mexico || Decision (30:27)  || 3 ||3:00

|-  style="background:#fbb;"
| 2017-11-|| Loss ||align=left| Ian Petrovich || 2017 WAKO World Championships, Semi-finals || Budapest, Hungary || Decision (Unanimous) || 3 ||2:00 
|-
! style=background:white colspan=9 |
|-  style="background:#cfc;"
| 2017-11-|| Win||align=left| Adilson Facchin || 2017 WAKO World Championships, Quarter Finals || Budapest, Hungary || Decision (Unanimous) || 3 ||2:00

|-  style="background:#fbb;"
| 2017-10-21|| Loss ||align=left| Jakub Klauda || 2017 IFMA European Championships, Final || Paris, France || Decision (29:27) || 3 ||3:00 
|-
! style=background:white colspan=9 |

|-  style="background:#cfc;"
| 2017-10-18|| Win ||align=left| Wassim Elkassem || 2017 IFMA European Championships, Semi-finals || Paris, France || Decision (29:28) || 3 ||3:00

|-  style="background:#fbb;"
| 2017-07-28|| Loss ||align=left| Jakub Klauda || 2017 World Games, Quarter Finals || Wroclaw, Poland || Decision (30:27)|| 3 || 3:00

|-  style="background:#cfc;"
| 2017-05-11|| Win ||align=left| Wassim Elkassem || 2017 IFMA World Championship, Final || Minsk, Belarus || Decision (30:27) || 3 || 3:00 
|-
! style=background:white colspan=9 |

|-  style="background:#cfc;"
| 2017-05-10|| Win ||align=left| Luke Thompson || 2017 IFMA World Championship, Semi-finals || Minsk, Belarus || Decision (30:27) || 3 || 3:00

|-  style="background:#cfc;"
| 2017-05-08|| Win ||align=left| Kristap Zile || 2017 IFMA World Championship, Quarter Finals || Minsk, Belarus || Walk Over ||  ||

|-  style="background:#cfc;"
| 2017-05-07|| Win ||align=left| Ivan Danilau || 2017 IFMA World Championship, First Round || Minsk, Belarus || Decision (30:26) || 3 || 3:00

|-  style="background:#fbb;"
| 2016-11-|| Loss ||align=left| Mateusz Kubiszyn || 2016 WAKO European Championships, Semi-finals || Loutraki, Greece || Decision (Unanimous) || 3 ||2:00 
|-
! style=background:white colspan=9 |

|-  style="background:#fbb;"
| 2015-08-|| Loss||align=left| Tejenov Yallakapberdi || 2015 IFMA World Championship, First Round || Bangkok, Thailand || TKO || 1||

|-  style="background:#cfc;"
| 2014-10-25|| Win||align=left| Nicolas Chiummiento || 2014 WAKO European Championships, Final || Bilbao, Spain || KO ||  || 
|-
! style=background:white colspan=9 |

|-  style="background:#cfc;"
| 2014-10-24|| Win||align=left| Konstantin Filatov || 2014 WAKO European Championships, Semi-finals || Bilbao, Spain || Decision (Split) || 3 ||2:00

|-  style="background:#cfc;"
| 2014-10-22|| Win||align=left| Christoph Mallitis || 2014 WAKO European Championships, Quarter Finals || Bilbao, Spain || Decision (Unanimous) || 3 ||2:00

|-  style="background:#fbb;"
| 2013-09-|| Loss ||align=left| Marat Paratsev || 2013 WAKO European Junior Championships, Final || Krynica-Zdrój, Poland ||  ||  || 
|-
! style=background:white colspan=9 |

|-  style="background:#cfc;"
| 2013-09-|| Win||align=left| Marko Milun || 2013 WAKO European Junior Championships, Semi-finals || Krynica-Zdrój, Poland ||  ||  ||

|-
| colspan=9 | Legend:

References

1995 births
Living people
Turkish male kickboxers
Sportspeople from Gaziantep